Patterns of Jazz is an album by saxophonist Cecil Payne recorded in 1956 and re-issued on the Savoy label. The original release was under the title "Cecil Payne Quartet And Quintet" on the short-lived Signal label.

Reception

The AllMusic review by Jim Todd stated: "For listeners who have yet to become acquainted with Cecil Payne, this classic mid-'50s Savoy recording would make a good introduction".

Track listing 
All compositions by Cecil Payne, except as indicated
 "This Time the Dream's on Me" (Harold Arlen, Johnny Mercer) - 3:46	
 "How Deep Is the Ocean?" (Irving Berlin) - 7:47	
 "Chessman's Delight" (Randy Weston) - 5:27	
 "Arnetta" - 3:38	
 "Saucer Eyes" (Weston) - 6:38	
 "Man of Moods" (Duke Jordan, Cecil Payne) - 5:33	
 "Bringing up Father" - 6:19	
 "Groovin' High"  (Dizzy Gillespie) - 4:22
Recorded at Van Gelder Studio on May 19 (tracks 1-4) and May 22 (tracks 5-8), 1956

Personnel 
Cecil Payne - baritone saxophone
Kenny Dorham - trumpet (tracks 5-8)
Duke Jordan - piano 
Tommy Potter - bass
Art Taylor - drums

References 

1957 albums
Cecil Payne albums
Albums recorded at Van Gelder Studio
Savoy Records albums